Watching My Life Go By is the third studio album by Michael Hedges released in 1985. After two solo instrumental albums, Hedges sang on all the tracks on this release.

Reception

Music critic Jason Anderson, writing for Allmusic, wrote of the album "Subdued, almost uncharacteristically restrained, Hedges the singer/songwriter doesn't quite live up to Hedges the avant-garde or self-proclaimed "violent acoustic" guitarist... A bit of a learning experience, Watching My Life Go By might not be Hedges' finest offering; however, the record still features plenty of great performances of heartfelt material."

Track listing
All compositions by Michael Hedges except "All Along the Watchtower" by Bob Dylan.

 "Face Yourself" – 4:43
 "I'm Coming Home" – 4:14
 "Woman of the World" – 4:17
 "Watching My Life Go By" – 3:16
 "I Want You" – 4:00
 "The Streamlined Man" – 3:46
 "Out on the Parkway" – 2:58
 "Holiday" – 5:14
 "All Along the Watchtower" (Bob Dylan) – 3:01
 "Running Blind" – 4:54

"Holiday" ends with Hedges singing the first verse of "My Country, 'Tis of Thee", which is not credited in the liner notes.

Personnel
Michael Hedges – guitar, vocals, bass ("I'm Coming Home", "Running Blind"), flute ("Woman of the World"), synthesizer ("I Want You", "Holiday"), harmonica ("Holiday"), wine glasses ("Out on the Parkway")
Michael Manring – fretless bass ("Face Yourself", "I Want You", "Out on the Parkway")
John Hanes – drums ("I Want You")
Bobby McFerrin – chant and solo vocals ("The Streamlined Man")
Hilleary Burgess – wine glasses ("Out on the Parkway"), production coordination
Elliot Mazer - engineer
Bryan Lanser, Marty Atkinson, Wes Weaver, Neil Janklow - assistant engineers
Anne Robinson - album design
Irene Young - cover portrait
Carol Erlich - photo tinting
Ruth Carroll Hedges - liner photo

Production notes
Produced by Elliot Mazer
Engineered by Elliot Mazer, Michael Hedges
Mastered by George Horn
Design by Anne Robinson
Photography by Irene Young

References 

1985 albums
Michael Hedges albums
Albums produced by Elliot Mazer
Windham Hill Records albums